Maurice Deloraine (1898–1991) was a French engineer, executive and technical director of International Telephone and Telegraph. Deloraine was strongly involved in the development of the so-called Huff-Duff.

References

1898 births
1991 deaths
ESPCI Paris alumni
20th-century French inventors